Acianthera beyrodtiana is a species of orchid plant.

References 

beyrodtiana
Plants described in 1908